Bojanovice is a municipality and village in Prague-West District in the Central Bohemian Region of the Czech Republic. It has about 500 inhabitants.

Administrative parts
Villages of Malá Lečice and Senešnice are administrative parts of Bojanovice. They form an exclave of the municipal territory.

References

Villages in Prague-West District